Nikolay Dyulgerov (born 10 March 1988) is a Bulgarian retired professional footballer who played as a midfielder.

Career
In June 2018, Dyulgerov joined Second League club Tsarsko Selo.

Career statistics

References

External links
 
 

1988 births
Living people
Footballers from Sofia
Bulgarian footballers
Bulgaria under-21 international footballers
Bulgarian expatriate footballers
Association football midfielders
First Professional Football League (Bulgaria) players
Second Professional Football League (Bulgaria) players
Kazakhstan Premier League players
Serie C players
Liga Leumit players
Macedonian First Football League players
PFC Minyor Pernik players
PFC Slavia Sofia players
PFC Ludogorets Razgrad players
PFC CSKA Sofia players
PFC Lokomotiv Plovdiv players
FC Spartak Semey players
FC Septemvri Sofia players
S.S. Akragas Città dei Templi players
Neftochimic Burgas players
Hapoel Marmorek F.C. players
FC Tsarsko Selo Sofia players
FK Rabotnički players
FC Sportist Svoge players
Bulgarian expatriate sportspeople in Kazakhstan
Bulgarian expatriate sportspeople in Italy
Bulgarian expatriate sportspeople in Israel
Expatriate footballers in Kazakhstan
Expatriate footballers in Italy
Expatriate footballers in Israel